Tiina Intelmann (born 25 August 1963) is an Estonian diplomat; she was the Permanent Representative of Estonia to the United Nations in New York from 2005 to 2011 and was the President of the Assembly of States Parties of the International Criminal Court from December 2011 until December 2014. Since then, she is the Head of the Delegation of the European Union to Liberia. Since 2017 she is the Estonian ambassador to the United Kingdom.

Early life and education
Born in Tallinn, Intelmann was graduated from Leningrad State University in 1987 with a Master of Arts degree in Italian language and literature.

Career

In 1991, Intelmann became a diplomat with the Ministry of Foreign Affairs of Estonia. From 1999 to 2002, she was Estonia's Permanent Representative to the Organization for Security and Cooperation in Europe. From 2002 to 2005 Intelmann was the Foreign Ministry's Undersecretary for Political Affairs and Relations with the Press. She became the Permanent Representative to the United Nations on 30 March 2005. In 2011, her term at the UN ended and she became Estonia's ambassador to Israel and Estonia's non-resident ambassador to Montenegro.

On 12 December 2011, Intelmann was elected to succeed Christian Wenaweser as the President of the Assembly of States Parties of the International Criminal Court. She is the first woman to have headed the ICC's Assembly of States Parties. Tiina Intelmann was succeeded as President of the Assembly by Sidiki Kaba, Minister of Justice of Senegal.

On 4 August 2021, the European Union External Action Service announced that Intelmann was appointed as the Head of Delegation of the European Union to Somalia. Intelmann's duties in this capacity began on 1 September 2021.

References

External links
"Tiina Intelmann of Estonia Chair of Second Committee", UN Doc BIO/3802, GA/EF/3142, 2006-09-12
"The Bureau recommends Ambassador Tiina Intelmann (Estonia) for President of the Assembly for the next triennium", Assembly of States Parties, 2011-07-28

1963 births
Living people
Ambassadors of Estonia to Israel
Ambassadors of Estonia to Montenegro
Ambassadors of Estonia to the United Kingdom
Estonian women diplomats
Ambassadors of the European Union to Liberia
Permanent Representatives of Estonia to the United Nations
Presidents of the Assembly of States Parties of the International Criminal Court
People from Tallinn
Saint Petersburg State University alumni
Estonian officials of the European Union
Women ambassadors